Sincheon-dong or Sincheon is a neighbourhood (dong) in Songpa-gu, Seoul served by Jamsillaru Station on Seoul Subway Line 2. The name means "new stream" and is a name for several other places in South and North Korea.

Education
Schools located in Sincheon-dong:
 Jamdong Elementary School
 Jamhyun Elementary School
 Jamsil Elementary School
 Jamsil Middle School
 Jamsil High School

Transportation 
 Jamsilnaru Station of 
 Mongchontoseong Station of

See also
Administrative divisions of South Korea

References

External links
 Songpa-gu map

Neighbourhoods of Songpa District